Bangabandhu Hi-Tech City Railway Station is a B class railway station in Bangladesh located on the western side of Bangabandhu Hi-Tech City in Kaliakair Upazila of Gazipur District. The station was inaugurated on 1 November 2018. It is regarded as a ghost station now.

Infrastructure
The original design of this station is designed like the central station of the country named Kamalapur railway station in Dhaka District. Its estimated construction budget is ৳50 crore. It consists of a platform and a loop line.

Service
Following is the list of trains passing through Bangabandhu Hi-Tech Park Railway Station:

 Sirajganj Express
 Tangail Commuter
 Kaliakor Commuter

Accident
 7 November 2020: 766 Down Nilsagar Express collided with a passenger bus at a railway crossing in Sonakhali area near Bangabandhu Hi-Tech City Railway Station around 4 am. Two people including a bus passenger died. Another one died after the three injured were taken to Kaliakair Upazila Health Complex.

References

External links 

Railway stations in Gazipur District
Railway stations opened in 2018
Memorials to Sheikh Mujibur Rahman